I.N.R.I. is a 1923 German silent religious epic film directed by Robert Wiene and starring Gregori Chmara, Henny Porten, and Asta Nielsen. The film is a retelling of the events leading up to the crucifixion of Jesus Christ. It was based on a 1905 novel by Peter Rosegger. It was reissued in 1933 in the United States with an added music track and narration as Crown of Thorns.

The film uses a framing device set in modern Russia. The film is generally conventional in its treatment of the story except for the character of Judas Iscariot. Judas is portrayed as a social revolutionary who wants Jesus to become the leader of a Jewish uprising against the Roman army of occupation. Judas' eventual betrayal of Jesus comes from political disillusionment rather than money. The Judas role was very important to the film as it was conceived by Wiene, because it linked the biblical story to the framing story. However, the modern scenes provoked opposition from the censors, and the film was generally shown without them. It premiered in Berlin on Christmas Day 1925.

The film was shot over 90 days between May and September 1923 at the Staaken Studios in Berlin. It was made with a star cast, expensive sets and hundreds of extras. The film's art direction was by Ernő Metzner. In scale and length, it was the largest film directed by Wiene during his career.

Cast

References

Bibliography

External links

1923 films
Films of the Weimar Republic
German silent feature films
German drama films
Films directed by Robert Wiene
Religious epic films
Film portrayals of Jesus' death and resurrection
1923 drama films
Films shot at Staaken Studios
Bavaria Film films
German black-and-white films
German epic films
Cultural depictions of Pontius Pilate
Portrayals of Mary Magdalene in film
Silent drama films
Silent adventure films
1920s German films